The 2018–19 Northwestern Wildcats men's basketball team represented Northwestern University in the 2018–19 NCAA Division I men's basketball season. They were led by sixth-year head coach Chris Collins as members of the Big Ten Conference. They played their home games at the newly renovated Welsh-Ryan Arena in Evanston, Illinois. The Wildcats finished the season 13–19, 4–16 in Big Ten play to finish in last place. They lost in the first round of the Big Ten tournament to Illinois.

Previous season
The Wildcats finished the 2017–18 season 15–17, 6–12 in Big Ten play to finish in 10th place. They lost in the second round of the Big Ten tournament to Penn State.

Offseason

Departures

Incoming transfers

2018 recruiting class

Roster

Schedule and results

|-
!colspan=9 style=| Exhibition

|-
!colspan=9 style=| Regular season

|-
!colspan=9 style=|Big Ten tournament

References

Northwestern Wildcats
Northwestern Wildcats men's basketball seasons
Northwestern Wild
Northwestern Wild